Bramalea may refer to:

 Bramalea, Ontario, a neighbourhood of Brampton, built by Bramalea Limited
 Bramalea (company)
 Bramalea (horse), a Thoroughbred racehorse